Groß Kedingshagen Manor is a manor house in Kramerhof municipality, Germany.

History
The manor was built in 1860 by Johann Heinrich Bartels in a Gothic Revival style. When it became part of East Germany, the property was expropriated and served a number of purposes. Both the manor and park were neglected. Since 1997, it is privately owned.

References

Castles in Mecklenburg-Western Pomerania
Vorpommern-Rügen